Andreas Granqvist (born 16 April 1985) is a Swedish former professional footballer who played as a centre-back. He currently serves as the director of sports of Helsingborgs IF.

Starting his career with Helsingborgs IF in the mid-2000s, he went on to play for clubs in England, the Netherlands, Italy, and Russia before retiring at Helsingborg in 2021.

A full international between 2006 and 2021, he won 88 caps for the Sweden national team and represented his country at four UEFA European Championships as well as the 2018 FIFA World Cup. He captained the national team between 2016 and 2021. However, due to injuries, he played his last international match in 2019.

He was awarded Guldbollen (the Golden Ball), given to the Swedish player of the year, in 2017.

Club career
Born in Påarp, Granqvist started his career with his local club, Påarps GIF. He later transferred to Helsingborgs IF and he made his debut in Allsvenskan, 2004. Two years later he was team captain, when the club won its third Swedish Cup title, beating Gefle IF with 2–0. The victorious Helsingborg side also contained Swedish internationals Henrik Larsson and Andreas Jakobsson as well as former Hibernian goalkeeper Daniel Andersson.

In January 2007, he completed a loan move to Wigan Athletic with a view to a permanent deal in the summer. On 19 June 2007, he signed a two-year deal with Wigan, for a fee reported to be around £750,000. On 12 March 2008, he returned to Helsingborg on a loan deal until the end of the English season in June.

On 9 July 2008, Granqvist signed a four-year contract with Dutch club, Groningen, with Wigan receiving a fee of around £600,000. On 13 September 2008, he scored after a 65-metre solo run, a remarkable feat, which he again managed to accomplish in the last match of the regular season on 10 May 2009.

On 15 June 2011, Groningen sold Granqvist to Genoa for €2 million. The Swedish international has signed a four-year contract with the Italian club.

On 16 August 2013, Granqvist moved from Genoa to Russian Premier League side Krasnodar.

On 28 January 2018, it was announced that Granqvist would return to Helsingborgs IF after the World Cup. He would join the club on a 3.5-year player contract that would be followed by a three-year term as the director of sports for the club. He officially played his farewell game for Krasnodar on 13 May 2018.

Granqvist officially retired on 17 July 2021, having played in 6 leagues; Allsvenskan, Premier League, Eredivisie, Serie A, Russian Premier League and Superettan, never playing for 2 clubs in one country. He said that he wanted to continue, but his body wasn't feeling it. He continued working at Helsingborg IF as the director of sports.

International career
Granqvist played for the Swedish national team, and, in May 2008, he was included in Sweden's 23-man squad for UEFA Euro 2008.
He was an unused substitute in all three of Sweden's games. In 2011, he played in the finals of the Cyprus International Football Tournament, but Sweden lost to Ukraine. On 6 July 2016 Granqvist was appointed captain of Sweden by the new manager Janne Andersson. Granqvist succeeded Zlatan Ibrahimović after the latter's retirement from the national team following UEFA Euro 2016.

In May 2018 he was named in the 23-man Sweden squad for the 2018 FIFA World Cup in Russia. He captained the team for their opening World Cup fixture against South Korea on 18 June 2018. Over the course of the match he provided several long balls over the top which posed a threat to the South Korean defenders. In the 65th minute he scored the only goal of the game, calmly slotting home from the penalty spot. He was given the Player of the match award. Nine days later he scored another penalty, the second goal in a 3–0 win over Mexico which meant Sweden qualified for the next round and topped the group. Overall, Granqvist played a full 90 minutes in all games as Sweden were eliminated by England in the quarter final.

In May 2021, Granqvist was somewhat controversially included in Sweden's 26-man squad for the postponed UEFA Euro 2020, since he had not made an appearance for the national team for nearly two years due to ongoing injury problems.

Personal life
Granqvist goes by the nickname), originating from his last name which means "spruce twig".

Granqvist became a father for a second time after his wife Sofie gave birth in Helsingborg on 6 July 2018, while he was with the Sweden team at the World Cup in Russia.

Career statistics

Club

International

Sweden's score is listed first, and the score column indicates the score after each Granqvist goal.

Honours
Helsingborgs IF
Superettan: 2018
Svenska Cupen: 2006
Individual
Guldbollen: 2017
Fotbollsgalan Best Defender: 2014, 2015, 2017, 2018
FIFA World Cup Fantasy Team: 2018

References

External links

 
  (archive)
  (archive)
 

1985 births
Living people
People from Helsingborg Municipality
Swedish footballers
Helsingborgs IF players
Wigan Athletic F.C. players
FC Groningen players
Genoa C.F.C. players
FC Krasnodar players
Allsvenskan players
Superettan players
Premier League players
Eredivisie players
Serie A players
Russian Premier League players
Sweden international footballers
Sweden under-21 international footballers
UEFA Euro 2008 players
UEFA Euro 2012 players
UEFA Euro 2016 players
2018 FIFA World Cup players
UEFA Euro 2020 players
Swedish expatriate footballers
Expatriate footballers in England
Swedish expatriate sportspeople in England
Expatriate footballers in the Netherlands
Swedish expatriate sportspeople in the Netherlands
Expatriate footballers in Italy
Expatriate footballers in Russia
Sportspeople from Helsingborg
Association football defenders
Swedish expatriate sportspeople in Italy
Swedish expatriate sportspeople in Russia